Kareem Salama is an American musician of North African descent. He is a singer/songwriter and penned by some in the media as the first American Muslim country music singer. His music is a hybrid of country, pop and rock music. He has released 3 albums Generous Peace (2006) This Life of Mine (2007) and a third City of Lights (2011), the latter after signing for LightRain Records.

Background and education
Salama was born in Ponca City, Oklahoma, United States. His parents immigrated to the United States in the late 1960s to attend graduate school. He studied at University of Oklahoma, where he majored in chemical engineering. Then he entered law school at the University of Iowa in Iowa City graduating with a degree in Law.

Career
With his parents' encouragement and financial assistance, Salama began recording his first album Generous Peace while in law school with Greek-American producer, Aristotle Mihalopoulos. Salama also released the title track "Generous Peace" as his debut single accompanied by a music video. After another self-released album titled This Life of Mine, Salama was signed in 2011 to LightRain Records that released his third album to which he is signed.

Salama has performed in front of audiences as far as Rome and London. He also took part in a State Department European concert tour, performing in Paris. He has been featured in major media outlets like the New York Times, Christian Science Monitor, Reader's Digest, Fox News, Sky News and France 24..

Salama also embarked on a Middle East and North Africa tour in summer 2010. visiting Egypt, Morocco, Syria, Jordan, Kuwait and Bahrain.

Influences

While in school, Salama made time to work on his music with a friend and producer Aristotle Mihalopoulos. Salama says that his music is inspired by a variety of things including his own experiences, experiences of friends and family, and things that he reads. As a result of growing in Oklahoma Salama was around country music from the time he was very young and is attracted to the stories and the reverent nature of country music.

Salama highlights universal themes about love, home and family values. His songs are spiritual, without being overtly religious. One inspired by the writings of an 8th-century Islamic scholar, Imam Muhammed Al-Shafi'ee, endorses the idea of tolerance and avoiding violence in his debut single "Generous Peace": "Gentleman, I'm like incense, the more you burn me, the more I'm fragrant."

The WitWits
The WitWits is a television youth project and is a LightRain Records presentation in association with Zenfilm. It is co-written by Kareem and Omar Salama, directed by W. Ross Wells and produced by Meridith Melville and Brittany Holland. The WitWits is  about four kids, Kelly Ann (Alicia Lore), Super K (Caleb Duncan), Spencer (Austin Karkowsky), and Dougie (Grant Goodman) and their adventures in the 1980s, particularly in facing their nemesis, Rodney (Connor Jones). The project includes various television episodes, theatrical music videos as well as musical releases including promotional materials, singles with their debut "Radio Countdown" and a prospective album.

Discography

Albums
Salama has released three albums thus far:

EPs

Singles

Videography
 "Generous Peace"  (music video directed by Lena Khan)
 "Generous Peace" (Arabic) 
 "Makes Me Crazy" 
 "Be Free Now" (feat. Kelley Peters) 
 "1980 Something" (feat. The WitWits) 
 "Just Wanna Come Home"

Kareem Salama in popular culture
On May 9, 2007, Kareem Salama was interviewed on Fox News about various Muslim American issues.
A reportage and brief interview about him was broadcast on France 24.
In March 2008, he was interviewed on Arab Radio and Television Network (ART) program "From America" by Jihan Mansour. He also performed live renditions of some of his songs with Aristotle Mihalopoulos 
On 13 July 2008, he was interviewed on Sky News by Adam Boulton.

Notes

References

External links 

 
 MySpace 
 
 

1978 births
Living people
American Muslims
American people of Egyptian descent
Performers of Islamic music
American country singer-songwriters
American male singer-songwriters
People from Ponca City, Oklahoma
University of Iowa College of Law alumni
Singer-songwriters from Oklahoma
21st-century American singers
Country musicians from Oklahoma
21st-century American male singers